Steve Smith (25 November 1989 – 10 May 2016), commonly known as Stevie Smith, was a Canadian professional downhill mountain biker.

Biography
Born in Cassidy, British Columbia, Smith was (as of September 2013) 2nd in the world rankings on the Union Cycliste Internationale (UCI) Downhill Mountain Bike circuit. In 2013 Steve Smith secured his first overall victory in the UCI DHI World Cup by winning the last race in Leogang, Austria.

On 10 May 2016, Smith died after suffering a brain injury resulting from an enduro motorcycle accident in his hometown of Nanaimo, British Columbia.

References

External links
 
 

1989 births
2016 deaths
Canadian male cyclists
Canadian mountain bikers
Motorcycle racers who died while racing
Sport deaths in Canada